Nina Kläy (born 12 September 1989) is a Swiss taekwondo practitioner. 

She won a bronze medal in lightweight at the 2013 World Taekwondo Championships, after being defeated by Kim Hwi-lang in the semifinal. She participated at the World Taekwondo Championships five times (2007, 2009, 2011, 2013, 2015). Her achievements at the European Taekwondo Championships include a gold medal in 2014, and a bronze medal in 2006.

References

External links

1989 births
Living people
Swiss female taekwondo practitioners
World Taekwondo Championships medalists
European Taekwondo Championships medalists
21st-century Swiss women